The 2011 season was the 32nd season of competitive football in Malaysia.

Promotion and Relegation
Teams relegated from the Malaysia Super League
 Pahang FA
 Perlis FA

Teams promoted to the Malaysia Super League
 PKNS FC
 Sarawak FA

Teams relegated from the Malaysia Premier League
 SDMS Kepala Batas FC
 Penang FA
 
Teams promoted to the Malaysia Premier League
 Betaria FC
 Johor MBJB FC

Coaching changes

National teams competitions

Men's senior team

1 Non FIFA 'A' international match
XI Malaysia uses a selection of players from the Malaysia Super League, Using the name Malaysia XI

League XI

1 Non FIFA 'A' international match
XI Malaysia uses a selection of players from the Malaysia Super League, Using the name Malaysia XI

Men's under-23 team

* Malaysia's score always listed first

Men's under-19 team

* Malaysia's score always listed first

Men's under-16 team

* Malaysia's score always listed first

League tables

Super League

A total of fourteen teams participated in the league, including twelve sides from the 2010 season and two promoted teams from the 2010 Malaysia Premier League.

Johor FA and Penang FA were relegated at the end of the 2010 Super League Malaysia after finishing the season in the bottom two places of the league table.

2010 Malaysia Premier League champions Felda United FC and runners-up Sabah FA secured direct promotion to the Super League.

Harimau Muda A secured a place in the Super League after KL Plus withdrew. Harimau had won the 2009 Premier League Malaysia before playing the 2010 campaign in the Slovak First League. Harimau represent the Malaysian Under 21 national football team.

Notes
PLUS withdrew from Super League before the start of 2011 season

Premier League

A total of twelve teams participated in the league, including eight sides from the 2010 Malaysia Premier League season, two newly promoted teams from 2010 Malaysia FAM Cup and two relegated teams from the 2010 Super League Malaysia season.

Johor FA and Penang FA were relegated from 2010 Malaysia Premier League after finishing the season in the bottom two places of the league table. There was a plan to merge Johor FA and Johor FC so that Johor FA can still compete at the Malaysia's top league, Malaysia Super League. The plan was drop due to unknown reason.

2010 Malaysia FAM Cup champions Sime Darby FC and runners-up Sinar Dimaja Mai Sarah FC secured direct promotion to the Malaysia Premier League.

FAM League

A total of eleven teams participated in the league, including four sides from the 2010 Malaysia FAM Cup season, two relegated teams from the 2010 Malaysia Premier League season and featuring 5 new teams which two teams that won the National Region Play Off and three newly created teams which is Tentera Darat FC, TUDM Hornet FC and Kor RAMD FC.

SDMS Kepala Batas FC and Malacca FA were relegated from 2010 Malaysia Premier League after finishing the season in the bottom two places of the league table. National Region Play Off champions, Betaria FC and Rapid KL FC secured direct promotion to the Malaysia Premier League.

President Cup

The final was played at Sultan Mohammad IV Stadium, Kelantan on Tuesday, 26 July 2011.

Domestic Cups

Charity Shield

The 2011 edition was played at Shah Alam Stadium, Selangor on Saturday, 29 January 2011.

FA Cup

The final was played at National Stadium, Bukit Jalil, Kuala Lumpur, on Saturday, 11 June 2011.

Malaysia Cup

The final was played at the Shah Alam Stadium, Selangor, on Saturday, 29 October 2011. The original venue was the National Stadium, Bukit Jalil, but the Football Association of Malaysia were forced to change the venue because the national stadium were undergoing repairs on the stadium's roof.

References

 
1
Malaysia
Malaysia
Malaysia Super League seasons